William de Clinton, Earl of Huntingdon (c.1304 – 31 October 1354) and Lord High Admiral, was the younger son of John de Clinton, 1st Baron Clinton (d.1312/13) of Maxstoke Castle, Warwickshire, and Ida de Odingsells, the granddaughter of Ida II Longespee.  

The surname Clinton came from the lordship of Clinton in Oxfordshire, given to them at the Conquest. Geoffrey de Clinton was Lord Chamberlain and Treasurer of Henry I, while Roger de Clinton was Bishop of Coventry 1127–1148.

William de Clinton was a boyhood companion of Edward III of England, and one of the king's followers who secretly entered Nottingham Castle and captured Roger Mortimer, 1st Earl of March. The arrest and subsequent execution of Mortimer cleared the way for the adolescent Edward III to assume power. William de Clinton married Juliana de Leybourne, widow of John Hastings, 2nd Baron Hastings. 

From 6 September 1330 to 14 January 1337 he served in Parliament. In 1333, he was constituted Lord Admiral of the Seas. On 16 March 1337, Edward III created William de Clinton Earl of Huntingdon. William de Clinton died in 1354, leaving an only daughter, Elizabeth, whose legitimacy is doubtful.

Notes

1304 births
1354 deaths
14th-century English Navy personnel
Earls of Huntingdon
English admirals
Clinton, William de, Earl of Huntingdon
14th-century English people
Peers created by Edward III